Guy Jackson (1882 – death unknown) was an American Negro league pitcher in the 1910s. 

Jackson made his Negro leagues debut in 1909 with the Illinois Giants before playing with the Chicago Union Giants in 1911. In the following two seasons, he played for the Chicago Giants. Jackson spent 1914 with the Lincoln Stars, then finished his career in 1915 back with the Chicago Giants.

References

External links
  and Seamheads

1882 births
Place of birth missing
Place of death missing
Date of birth missing
Year of death missing
Chicago Giants players
Illinois Giants players
Lincoln Stars (baseball) players
Schenectady Mohawk Giants players
Baseball pitchers
Kansas City Royal Giants players